The 2013 Louisville Cardinals football team represented the University of Louisville in the 2013 NCAA Division I FBS football season. The Cardinals were led by fourth-year head coach Charlie Strong.  The Cardinals played their home games at Papa John's Cardinal Stadium in Louisville, Kentucky. They were in their last year as a member of the American Athletic Conference (formerly known as the Big East) until they moved to the Atlantic Coast Conference starting on July 1, 2014. They finished the season 12–1, 7–1 in American Athletic play to finish in second place. They were invited to the Russell Athletic Bowl where they defeated Miami (FL).

Previous season
The Cardinals finished the 2012 season 11–2, 5–2 in Big East play to finish in a four-way tie for the Big East championship. As the highest rated of the four Big East champions in the final BCS poll, the Cardinals received the conference's automatic bid into a BCS game.  It marked also the first time the Cardinals won back-to-back BIG EAST titles.  Louisville finished a remarkable season by defeating third-ranked Florida 33–23 in the Allstate Sugar Bowl, giving the Cardinals their 11th win for just the fourth time in school history.

Schedule

Rankings

Roster

References

Louisville
Louisville Cardinals football seasons
Cheez-It Bowl champion seasons
Louisville Cardinals football